William Duncan may refer to:

Art Duncan (William James Arthur Duncan, 1891–1975), Canadian ice hockey professional and World War I flying ace
Bill Duncan (1880–?), Scottish footballer
W. Butler Duncan I (1830–1912), Scottish-American banker and railroad executive
W. Murdoch Duncan (1909–1976), Scottish crime thriller author
William Addison Duncan (1836–1884), U.S. Representative from Pennsylvania
William Augustine Duncan (1811–1885), Scottish journalist and colonial official
William Barr McKinnon Duncan (1922–1984), Scottish-born director of Imperial Chemical Industries, chief executive of Rolls-Royce
William Butler Duncan II (1862–1933), American yachtsman and adoptive son of William Butler Duncan I
William C. Duncan (1820–1877), brewer, politician, and mayor of Detroit, Michigan
William Dow Duncan (1892–1961), New Zealand rugby player
Sir William Duncan, 1st Baronet (died 1774), Scottish physician
William Duncan (actor) (1879–1961), Scottish-born actor and director of film serials
William Duncan (American physician) (1840–1900)
William Duncan (Australian cricketer) (1912–1943), Australian cricketer
William Duncan (footballer) (1913–1975), Scottish association football player
William Duncan (Maryland politician) (1871–1925), American politician and lawyer
William Duncan (missionary) (1832–1918), English-born Anglican missionary
William Duncan (New Zealand cricketer) (1933–2008), New Zealand cricketer
William Duncan (philosopher) (1717–1760), Scottish natural philosopher and classicist
William fitz Duncan (1090/1094–1147), Scottish prince and general
William Garnett Duncan (1800–1875), U.S. Representative from Kentucky
William H. Duncan, American diplomat
William Henry Duncan (1805–1863), English doctor and Britain's first Chief Medical Officer
William Jolly Duncan (1894–1960), Scottish physicist
William Wallace Duncan (1839–1908), American bishop of the Methodist Episcopal Church, South

See also
William Duncan Baxter (1868–1960), mayor of Cape Town, South Africa
William Duncan Connor (1864–1944), lieutenant governor of Wisconsin
William Duncan Herridge (1888–1961), Canadian politician
William Duncan MacMillan (1871–1948), American mathematician and astronomer